A referendum on the introduction of women's suffrage was held in Liechtenstein on 28 February 1971. Voting was restricted to men, and resulted in a majority against its introduction. Voter turnout was 85.6%. Following the referendum, some women demonstrated in Vaduz and other towns, booing male pedestrians and carrying signs bearing the slogan "Men of Liechtenstein: Where's your virility".

Results

References

1971 referendums
1971 in Liechtenstein
Referendums in Liechtenstein
Women's suffrage in Liechtenstein
Suffrage referendums
February 1971 events in Europe
1971 in women's history